Cory Grissom (born June 9, 1990) is a retired American football defensive end who played for the Green Bay Blizzard and Nebraska Danger of the Indoor Football League (IFL). He played college football for the University of South Florida.

Professional career

New England Patriots
On May 3, 2013, he signed with the New England Patriots as an undrafted free agent. On August 26, 2013, he was placed on the injured reserve list and missed the rest of the 2013 season. He was released on March 12, 2014. On March 19, 2014, he signed a one-year contract with the Kansas City Chiefs.

Miami Dolphins
On August 25, 2014, Grissom was signed by the Miami Dolphins. Despite sources stating that he was released the next day, Grissom disagrees with the statement that he was there for two days.

Nebraska Danger
On June 4, 2015, Grissom signed with the Nebraska Danger of the Indoor Football League.

Green Bay Blizzard
In April 2016, Grissom was traded to the Green Bay Blizzard. Grissom re-signed with the Blizzard on January 30, 2017. On October 10, 2017, Grissom re-signed with the Blizzard.

In his final season with the Green Bay Blizzard Grissom was named 2nd team All-IFL. 

Following the 2018 season, Grissom announced his retirement from Indoor Football via Facebook.

References

External links
South Florida Bulls bio
New England Patriots bio

1990 births
Living people
New England Patriots players
People from LaGrange, Georgia
Players of American football from Georgia (U.S. state)
South Florida Bulls football players
Nebraska Danger players
Green Bay Blizzard players